The 2nd Alpine Signal Regiment is a deployable signals regiment of the Italian Army based in Bolzano in South Tyrol that specializes in mountain warfare. Since 1951 it has been assigned of the 4th Alpine Army Corps and therefore a strong association with the army's mountain infantry corps, the Alpini, with whom the regiment shares the distinctive Cappello Alpino. The unit was first active from 1926 to 1932 as 2nd Radio-Telegraphers Regiment.

The unit was reformed in 1951 as a battalion and given the number IV, which had been used by two battalions active during World War II. During the Cold War the battalion was assigned to the IV Army Corps. In 1975 the battalion was named for the Gardena Pass and assigned the flag and traditions of the 2nd Radio-Telegraphers Regiment. In 1992 the battalion entered the newly formed 2nd Signal Regiment. In 2001 the regiment reformed the Battalion "Pordoi" as its second signal battalion. The regiment is assigned to the army's Signal Command and affiliated with the Alpine Troops Command.

History 
On 15 November 1926 the Radio-Telegraphers Engineer Regiment was split and the next day the 2nd Radio-Telegraphers Regiment was formed in Florence, which received the II, IV, and V battalions from the Radio-Telegraphers Engineer Regiment. After the split the 2nd Radio-Telegraphers Regiment formed two new battalions and then consisted of a command, the I, III, and V battalions in Milan, the II Battalion in Mestre, the IV Battalion in Alessandria, a depot in Florence, and two branch depots in Piacenza and Mantova. Each of the five battalions consisted of two companies. In 1930 the regiment moved from Florence to Novi Ligure.

On 28 October 1932 both radio-telegraphers regiments were disbanded and the units of the 2nd Radio-Telegraphers Regiment were distributed among the army's engineer regiments as follows:

 I Battalion -> 2nd Engineer Regiment
 II Battalion -> 3rd Engineer Regiment
 III Battalion -> 1st Engineer Regiment
 7th Company/ IV Battalion -> 4th Engineer Regiment
 8th Company/ IV Battalion -> 5th Engineer Regiment
 V Battalion -> 11th Engineer Regiment

The 2nd Radio-Telegraphers Regiment depot and depot personnel were used to from the 1st Miners Regiment.

Cold War 
On 20 August 1951 the IV Connections Battalion was formed in Bolzano as support unit of the IV Territorial Military Command. Due to its number the battalion became the spiritual successor of the IV Telegraphers Battalion, which had been formed by the 10th Engineer Regiment during World War II, and also of the IV Army Connections Battalion, which had been formed by the 5th Engineer Regiment during the same conflict. On 1 October 1952 the Connections Speciality became an autonomous speciality of the Engineer Arm, with its own school and gorget patches. On 16 May 1953 the speciality adopted the name Signal Speciality and consequently the IV Connections Battalion was renamed IV Signal Battalion on the same date. In January 1954 the battalion was renamed IV Army Corps Signal Battalion and consisted of a command, an operations company, a line construction company, and a signal center. In 1967 the battalion formed a second line construction company.

During the 1975 army reform the army disbanded the regimental level and newly independent battalions were granted for the first time their own flags. During the reform signal battalions were renamed for mountain passes. On 1 October 1975 the IV Army Corps Signal Battalion was renamed 4th Signal Battalion "Gardena" and assigned the flag and traditions of the 2nd Radio-Telegraphers Regiment. The battalion consisted of a command, a command and services platoon, three signal companies, and a repairs and recovery platoon.

On 22 January 1976 the battalion's troops received the Cappello Alpino. On 21 March 1976 the flag of the 2nd Radio-Telegraphers Regiment arrived in Bolzano and was transferred to the custody of the battalion. In 1978 the battalion was ordered to form a fourth signal company in Bolzano, but due to a lack of lodgings the company was only activated and staffed in December 1984.

7th Signal Company 
On 1 February 1949 the VII Connections Battalion was formed in Rovezzano as support unit of the VII Territorial Military Command in Florence. The battalion consisted of command, a command company, a connections operations company, line construction company, and the 7th Territorial Connections Company, which had been transferred to the new battalion from the VII Territorial Military Command. On 15 February 1954 the battalion was renamed VII Army Corps Signal Battalion and consisted of a command, an operations company, a line construction company, a signal center and the 7th Territorial Signal Company.

On 1 October 1957 the 7th Territorial Signal Company was transferred to the newly formed XLIII Signal Battalion. In October 1959 the battalion moved from Rovezzano to Paluzza in Friuli, where it joined the 5th Army Corps. On 1 March 1960 the VII Army Corps Signal Battalion was assigned to the Carnia-Cadore Troops Command, a division level command consisting of the Alpine Brigade "Cadore" and Alpine Brigade "Julia". The Carnia-Cadore Troops Command was part of the IV Army Corps and tasked with the defense of the Italian border in the Cadore region and along the Carnic Alps.

In 1962 the battalion moved to Bassano del Grappa. By 1969 the battalion consisted of a command, a command and services platoon, two active signal companies, and one reserve signal company.

The Carnia-Cadore Troops Command was disbanded in June 1975 and the VII Army Corps Signal Battalion passed to the IV Army Corps. On 31 August 1976 the battalion was reduced to 7th Signal Company and now consisted of a command, a command and services platoon, and three radio relay platoons.

Recent times 
On 27 August 1992 the 4th Signal Battalion "Gardena" lost its autonomy and the next day the battalion entered the newly formed 2nd Signal Regiment as Battalion "Spluga". On the same date the flag and traditions of the 2nd Radio-Telegraphers Regiment were transferred from the battalion to the 2nd Signal Regiment. The same day the Gardena incorporated the 7th Signal Company in Bassano del Grappa as 2nd Radio Relay Company, which was disbanded on 28 February 1999.

On 10 February 2000 the regiment joined the army's C4 IEW Command. On 26 September 2001 the regiment reformed Battalion "Pordoi" and became a projection signal regiment capable to deploy and operate outside Italy. On 1 January 2009 the regiment was renamed 2nd Alpine Signal Regiment.

Current structure 
As of 2023 the 2nd Alpine Signal Regiment consists of:

  Regimental Command, in Bolzano
  Command and Logistic Support Company
  Battalion "Gardena"
  1st Signal Company
  2nd Signal Company
  3rd Signal Company
  Battalion "Pordoi"
  4th Signal Company
  5th Signal Company
  6th Signal Company

The Command and Logistic Support Company fields the following platoons: C3 Platoon, Transport and Materiel Platoon, Medical Platoon, and Commissariat Platoon.

Military honors 
The Silver Medal of Military Valour and Bronze Medal of Military Valour affixed to the regiment's flag were awarded during World War II to the III Mixed Engineer Battalion "Julia" of the 3rd Alpine Division "Julia": the Silver Medal for the battalion's conduct during the Italian campaign on the Eastern Front and the Bronze Medal for the battalion's conduct during the Greco-Italian War. Both medals were given temporarily to the regiment and therefore are not depicted on the regiment's coat of arms. In case the III Mixed Engineer Battalion "Julia" should be reactivated the two medals would be returned to the battalion.

External links 
 Italian Army Website: 2° Reggimento Trasmissioni Alpino

References 

Signal Regiments of Italy
Military communications regiments